Trichodiadema hallii is succulent plant of the genus Trichodiadema, native to the Ladismith and Calitzdorp areas of the Western Cape Province, South Africa.

Description
A very small, erect shrublet, up to 6 cm tall in habitat, taller in cultivation, with tuberous roots.

The leaves are stiff and hard, and densely packed along the stems so that the internodes are not visible. 
They are covered in long epidermal cells that have robust papillae. The leaf tips have about 10 orange-brown bristles in an erect inclining diadem. 

The diadem bristles are an easy feature for identification, as this is the only species that has erect inclining diadems that are orange-brown (The diadems of Trichodiadema orientale and Trichodiadema mirabile are also erect-inclining, but are dark brown).

The flower stalks are another easy feature for identification, as they are extremely short and often cannot be seen at all. The flowers are pale pink to white, with petals in two series. 
The fruit capsule has five or six locules (sometimes four).

References

hallii
Taxa named by Louisa Bolus